The Université Robert Schuman, also known as Strasbourg III or URS, was a university in Strasbourg, Alsace, France. In 2007, there were nearly 10,000 students enrolled at the university, including more than 1,500 foreign students. The university tended to teach and research in fields such as law, politics and international relations. This university also included three grande écoles, the Institut d'études politiques de Strasbourg, the Institut Européen d'Etudes Commerciales Supérieures de Strasbourg (IECS), and the Centre Universitaire d'Enseignement du Journalisme (CUEJ). The Université Robert Schuman was named after the politician Robert Schuman, not to be confused with composer Robert Schumann.

On 1 January 2009, Robert Schuman University became part of the refounded University of Strasbourg and lost its status as an independent university.

See also

 Centre for International Industrial Property Studies (CEIPI)
 Institut Européen d'Etudes Commerciales Supérieures de Strasbourg (IECS)
 Institut d'études politiques de Strasbourg (IEP)
 University of Strasbourg
 Robert Schuman Institute

External links
 Université Robert Schuman

University of Strasbourg
Defunct universities and colleges in France
Educational institutions established in 1970